Episodes of the 1960s television cartoon King Leonardo and his Short Subjects, listed by segment and season.

The King And Odie
All cartoons follow a two-part format, with (for example) the first half in "Riches To Rags" and the conclusion in "Nose For The Noose." However, the final four cartoons ("S.O. Essex Calling," "The Big Falling Out," "Long Days Journey Into Fright" and "Making A Monkey Shine") form a four-part storyline.

The following cartoons originally aired on King Leonardo And His Short Subjects:

 Riches To Rags
 Nose For The Noose
 Drumming Up The Bongos
 How High Is Up?
 Royal Amnesia
 Loon From The Moon
 Royal Bongo War Chant
 Showdown At Dhyber Pass
 Duel To The Dearth
 Ringside Riot
 Bringing In Biggie
 Confound It Confusion
 Paris Pursuit
 The Awful Tower
 Beatnik Boom
 Call Out The Kids
 Trial Of The Traitors
 Battle Slip
 Heroes Are Made...With Salami
 The Big Freeze
 Perfume Panic
 Style Awhile
 Sticky Stuff
 Am I Glue
 Double Trouble
 Switcheroo Ruler
 The Legend of Leonardo The Neat
 Home Neat Home
 No Bong Bongos
 The Ad Game
 Debased Ball
 Bats In The Ballpark
 Long Lost Lennie
 Ghosts Guests
 Fatal Fever
 Pulling The Mane Switch
 Dim Gem
 The Clanking Castle Caper
 The King And Me
 The Loves Of Lynetta Lion
 The Sport Of Kings
 Black Is White
 True Blue Blues (appears in syndicated Dudley Do Right And Friends show #2727)
 My Dog Has Fleas (appears in syndicated Dudley Do Right And Friends show #2728)
 Lead Foot Leonardo (appears in syndicated Dudley Do Right And Friends show #2729)
 The Rat Race (appears in syndicated Dudley Do Right And Friends show #2730)
 The Obey Ball (appears in syndicated Dudley Do Right And Friends show #2731)
 Out Of The Depths (appears in syndicated Dudley Do Right And Friends show #2732)
 The Loco Play (appears in syndicated Dudley Do Right And Friends show #2733)
 Romeo And Joliet (appears in syndicated Dudley Do Right And Friends show #2734)
 If At First You Don't Succeed (appears in syndicated Dudley Do Right And Friends show #2735)
 Try, Try Again (appears in syndicated Dudley Do Right And Friends show #2736)
 Long Laugh Leonardo (appears in syndicated Dudley Do Right And Friends show #2737)
 He Who Laughs Last (appears in syndicated Dudley Do Right And Friends show #2738)
 East Side, West Side
 Coney Island Calamity
 An Ode In Code
 Two Beneath The Mast
 Hip Hip Hypnosis
 Odie Hit The Roadie
 Hunting A Hobby
 Teeing Off
 Smarty Gras
 Bayou Blues
 Stage Struck
 One Way Ticket To Venus
 Back To Nature
 My Vine Is Your Vine
 The Tourist Trade
 Bye Bye Bicycle
 Chicago Shenanigans
 Loop The Loop
 Uranium On The Cranium
 Mistaked Claim
 The Trail Of The Lonesome Mine
 The Treasure Of Sierra Bongo
 Fortune Feller
 Wild And Wobbly

The following cartoons were first aired during the 1963–1964 season on Tennessee Tuxedo and His Tales, and are syndicated as part of Dudley Do-Right and Friends. The Dudley Do Right And Friends syndicated episode number follows each title in parentheses.

 Introducing Mr. Mad (2701)
 Falling Asleep (2702)
 Hup-2-3-Hike (2703)
 Spring Along With Itch (2704)
 Left Alone Leonardo (2705)
 A Tour de Farce (2706)
 Get 'Em Up Scout (2707)
 The King Camps Out (2708)
 Offensive Defensive (2709)
 A Long Long Trail A-Binding (2710)
 Treasure Train (2711)
 Handcar Heroes (2712)
 Honey Hungry (2713) (misidentified as "Honey Business" on Tennessee Tuxedo and His Tales: The Complete Collection DVD case and booklet)
 Bye Bye Bees (2714)
 The Royal Race (2715)
 The Shifty Sail (2716)
 Asleep on the Deep (2717)
 An Ace for a King (2718)
 Odie Takes a Dive (2719)
 Go and Catch a Falling King (2720)
 Royal Rodeo (2721)
 Ride 'em Cowboy (2722)
 S.O. Essex Calling (Part 1 of 4) (2723)
 The Big Falling Out (Part 2 of 4) (2724)
 Long Days Journey Into Fright (Part 3 of 4) (2725)
 Making A Monkey Shine (Part 4 of 4)  (2726)

(The Columbia Pictures theatrical cartoons Midnight Frolics,  Tito's Guitar, Fiesta Time, The Carpenter, Cat-Nipped and Dog, Cat And Canary have been erroneously included in previous episode lists. A selection of Columbia cartoons appeared in early NBC telecasts of King Leonardo And His Short Subjects, and were a holdover from the network's run of Hanna-Barbera's Ruff And Reddy. Despite this, these erroneous Columbia titles appear to be part of the series' official records and are even used to identify certain cartoons in episode descriptions for King Leonardo And His Short Subjects on AOL's In2TV.)

Tooter Turtle
"Tooter Turtle" cartoons were repeated on Tennessee Tuxedo and His Tales, replacing "The Hunter" at the start of the 1964–1965 season. "Tooter Turtle" later resurfaced on The Dudley Do-Right Show, which aired Sunday mornings on ABC-TV from April 27, 1969 to September 6, 1970 ("Tooter" does not appear in the syndicated Dudley Do Right And Friends). The cartoons are also part of the current U.S. syndicated versions of King Leonardo And His Short Subjects and Tennessee Tuxedo and His Tales. The number following each cartoon title refers to the syndicated Tennessee Tuxedo episode in which that cartoon appears.

 Two Gun Turtle (*Fast On The Flaw) (*subtitle not shown on screen) (901, 946)
 Tailspin Tooter (Plane Failure) (902, 947)
 Sea Haunt (*Follow The Fish) (*subtitle not shown on screen) (903, 948)
 Highway Petrol (Road Block-Head) (904, 949)
 Knight Of The Square Table (905, 950)
 Mish-Mash-Mush (Panting For Gold) (906, 951)
 The Unteachables (The Lawless Years) (907, 952)
 Kink Of Swat (Babe Rube) (908, 953)
 One Trillion B.C. (Dinosaur Dope) (909, 954)
 Olimping Champion (Weak-Greek) (910, 955)
 Stuper Man (Muscle-Bounder) (911)
 Buffaloed Bill (Custard's Last Stand) (912)
 Moon Goon (Space Head) (913)
 Robin Hoodwink (Thimple Thief) (914)
 Steamboat Stupe (Captains Outrageous) (915)
 Souse Painter (Brush-Boob) (916)
 Railroad Engineer (Stupefied Jones) (917)
 Quarterback Hack (Pigskinned) (918)
 Drafthead (Overwhere?) (919)
 Lumber-Quack (Topped) (920)
 Jerky Jockey (Kenducky Derby) (921)
 Fired Fireman (Hook And Batter) (922)
 Sky Diver (Jump, Jerk, Jump!) (923)
 Tuesday Turtle (Private Pie) (924)
 Snafu Safari (Trackdown Tooter) (925)
 Anti-Arctic (North Pole Nuisance) (926)
 The Master Builder (Rivet Riot) (927)
 Taxi Turtle (My Flag Is Down) (928)
 Canned Camera (Peek-A Boob) (929)
 Muddled Mountie (One, Two, Buckle My Snowshoe) (930) ("Slowshoe Mountie" is an alternate title, possibly a working title)
 Duck Haunter (931)
 Bull Fright (Olay Down) (932)
 News Nuisance (Sub Scribe) (933)
 The Sheep Of Araby (Beau Geste Goes West) (934) ("Foreign Fleegion" is an alternate title, possibly a working title)
 Waggin' Train (California Bust) (935)
 Anchors Awry (Nautical Nut) (936)
 Vaudevillain (Song And Dunce Man) (937)
 Rod And Reeling (Field & Scream) (938)
 The Man In The Blue Denim Suit (Hay! Hay!) (939)

The Hunter
The following cartoons originally aired on King Leonardo And His Short Subjects:

 Brookloined Bridge (appears in syndicated Dudley Do Right And Friends Show #2733)
 Counterfeit Wants (appears in syndicated Dudley Do Right And Friends Show #2734)
 Haunted Hunter (appears in syndicated Dudley Do Right And Friends Show #2735)
 Fort Knox Fox (appears in syndicated Dudley Do Right And Friends Show #2736)
 Stealing A March (appears in syndicated Dudley Do Right And Friends Show #2737)
 Horn-A-Plenty (appears in syndicated Dudley Do Right And Friends Show #2738)
 Concrete Crook
 Subtracted Submarine
 Risky Ransom
 Unfaithful Old Faithful
 The Armored Car Coup
 Telephone Poltergeist
 Sheepish Shamus
 Rustler Hustler
 The Case Of The Missing Muenster
 The Great Train Robbery
 Florida Fraud
 The Great Plane Robbery
 Girl Friday
 Stamp Stickup
 Statue Of Liberty Play
 The Frankfurter Fix
 The Case Of The Missing Mower
 Fancy Fencing
 Racquet Racket
 Seeing Stars
 The Elevator Escapade
 Hula Hoop Havoc
 The Counterfeit Newspaper Caper
 Diamond Dither
 Grand Canyon Caper
 Borrowed Beachland
 Peek-A Boo Pyramids
 Lincoln Tunnel Caper (appears in syndicated Dudley Do Right And Friends Show #2727)
 TV Terror (appears in syndicated Dudley Do Right And Friends Show #2728)
 Bye Bye Bell (appears in syndicated Dudley Do Right And Friends Show #2729)
 Time Marches Out (appears in syndicated Dudley Do Right And Friends Show #2730)
 Fox's Foul Play (appears in syndicated Dudley Do Right And Friends Show #2731)
 Bow Wow Blues (appears in syndicated Dudley Do Right And Friends Show #2732)

The following cartoons were first aired during the 1963–1964 season on Tennessee Tuxedo and His Tales, and are syndicated as part of Dudley Do-Right and Friends. The Dudley Do-Right and Friends syndicated episode number follows each title in parentheses. ("The Hunter" was featured as a segment on Tennessee Tuxedo during the 1963–1964 season. Repeats of "Tooter Turtle" replaced "The Hunter" on Tennessee Tuxedo and His Tales when "The Hunter" moved to The Underdog Show in 1964. "Tooter Turtle" and "The Hunter" were also featured on The Dudley Do-Right Show on ABC-TV between 1968 and 1970. "The King and Odie" appears in the syndicated Dudley Do-Right and Friends, but was not part of The Dudley Do-Right Show.)

 Breaking In Big (2701)
 The Bank Dicks (2702)
 Eye On The Ball (2703)
 Breakout At Breakrock (2704)
 Getting The Business (2705)
 An Uncommon Cold (2706)
 The Pickpocket Pickle (2707)
 Goofy-Guarding (2708)
 The Big Birthday Blast (2709)
 Under The Spreading Treasure Tree (2710)
 School Days, Fool Days (2711)
 Fall Of The House Of The Hunter (2712)
 Oyster Stew (2713)
 The Stolen Spoon Saga (2714)
 Under Par (2715)
 Chew Gum Charlie (2716)
 Using The Ole Bean (2717)
 The Case Of The Hunted Hunter (2718)
 The Purloined Piano Puzzle (2719)
 Record Rocket (2720)
 The Hunter's Magic Lamp (2721)
 Hunter Goes Hollywood (2722)
 Two For The Turkey Trot (2723)
 Captain Horatio Hunter (Part 1 of 2) (2724)
 The Horn Of The Lone Hunter (Part 2 of 2) (2725)
 Little Boy Blues (2726)

Twinkles
 Twinkles and the Houseboat
 Twinkles and the Haunted House

Sources
http://www.bcdb.com/cartoons/Other_Studios/T/Total_Television_Productions/King_Leonardo_and_His_Short_Subjects/index.html

King Leonardo